The 1992 Croatian Second Football League was the first season of second-division football in Croatia.

The league consisted of 24 teams organized into four geographic groups: Jug (South, 8 teams), Sjever (North, 7 teams), Zapad (West, 4 teams), and Istok (East, 5 teams). Before the competition started, Metalac Sisak were excluded from the north region, and the east region did not play any games due to the war. The winners of each group played in a three-team playoff to determine the champion, won by NK Radnik Velika Gorica.

The league consisted of teams from the third and fourth Yugoslavian division who were not admitted to the 1992 Croatian First Football League.

West Group "Zapad"

South Group "Jug"

North Group "Sjever"

East Group "Istok"
The East Group was not played due to the Croatian War of Independence. The group would have consisted of NK Belišće, NK Croatia Bogdanovci, HŠK Marsonia Slavonski Brod, NK Metalac Osijek, and NK Olimpija Osijek. NK Belišće was invited to the 1. HNL for the 1992-93 season.

Playoff

References

1991–92 in Croatian football
1992
Cro